Cell cycle checkpoint protein RAD1 is a protein that in humans is encoded by the RAD1 gene.

Function 

This gene encodes a component of a heterotrimeric cell cycle checkpoint complex, known as the 9-1-1 complex, that is activated to stop cell cycle progression in response to DNA damage or incomplete DNA replication. The 9-1-1 complex is recruited by RAD17 to affected sites where it may attract specialized DNA polymerases and other DNA repair effectors. Alternatively spliced transcript variants encoding different isoforms of this gene have been described.

Interactions 

RAD1 homolog has been shown to interact with:
 HUS1,
 RAD17,  and
 RAD9A,

References

Further reading